Tropical Storm Sonia was a weak, late-season tropical cyclone that made a rare landfall in the Mexican state of Sinaloa during early-November 2013.

Meteorological history

The origins of Tropical Storm Sonia can be traced to a well-defined active phase of the Madden–Julian oscillation (MJO) that traversed eastward from the Central Pacific during late-October 2013. This was credited to the development of a very-broad low-level cyclonic circulation, over an area of nearly 15° of longitude well offshore Mexico. A tropical wave located several hundred miles to the south of Acapulco gradually entered the cyclonic circulation late on October 26, producing deep convection. Over the next couple of days convective activity halted, until becoming active again following the passage of the MJO on October 29, aiding the formation of a trough of low pressure. The trough slowly drifted northward in a passage between a mid-level ridge over the Gulf of Mexico and a deep mid-to-upper level trough over the Western United States. At 6:00 UTC the next day, the National Hurricane Center (NHC) began to monitor the disturbance for potential tropical cyclogenesis over the next few days.

Preparations and impact

In advance of Sonia, a Tropical Storm Watch was ordered for the coast of Sinaloa from Topolobampo to La Cruz, late on November 2. This was later upgraded to a Tropical Storm Warning from Altata to Mazatlán, Sinaloa at 9:00 UTC the next day, with a Tropical Storm Watch remaining from Altata to Topolobampo. Though just 24 hours later, all watches and warnings for Sinaloa were discontinued by the Government of Mexico. An overall green alert was issued for Mexico by the Global Disaster Alert and Coordination System (GDACS), signifying a low-level of danger. Secretariat of Security and Civilian Protection (SSCP) declared an orange alert for southern Baja California Sur, a yellow alert for central and southern Sinaloa, a green alert for northern Baja California Sur, northern Sinaloa, southern Sonora, southern Chihuahua, Durango, Nayarit, Zacatecas, and the Islas Marías. In addition, a blue alert was put in effect for central Sonora and central Chihuahua. Ahead of the storm, classes were cancelled in five municipalities of Sinaloa. Local officials prepared more than 60 temporary shelters in Cabo San Lucas and Sinaloa. The Port of Cabo San Lucas shut down on November 3 with the threat of Sonia, closing to ships with more than 500 tons (1 million lbs.) of cargo. Tourists boats meant for water activities were also prohibited from leaving port. As a precautionary measure, over 1,000 residents were evacuated in the cities of Culiacán and Navolato.

Sonia made landfall near El Dorado, Sinaloa as a rapidly weakening tropical storm on November 4, causing heavy rainfall over portions of Mexico. Several inches of precipitation was recorded in Cabo San Lucas along with winds of around 30 mph (50 km/h), as the storm passed close to the resort city. Heavy precipitation also occurred in the states of Nayarit, Jalisco, Durango, Chihuahua, and Aguascalientes. In Nayarit, one person was killed after being struck by lightning according to the Secretariat of National Defense (SEDENA).

See also

Tropical cyclones in 2013
Tropical Storm Norman (2012) — affected similar areas.

References

External links

 The NHC's advisory archive on Tropical Storm Sonia

Eastern Pacific tropical storms
2013 Pacific hurricane season
Tropical cyclones in 2012
November 2013 events in Mexico
2013 in Mexico
Hurricanes in Nayarit
Hurricanes in Jalisco 
Hurricanes in Durango
Hurricanes in Chihuahua
Hurricanes in Aguascalientes